Depanthus is a genus of shrubs in the family Gesneriaceae.  The genus is  endemic to New Caledonia in the Pacific and contains two species. It is related to Negria and Fieldia (syn. Lenbrassia).

List of species 
 Depanthus glaber 
 Depanthus pubescens

References

Endemic flora of New Caledonia
Gesnerioideae
Gesneriaceae genera